The Yacoubian building is a prominent commercial and residential edifice in Beirut, Lebanon. The building is located in Caracas neighborhood of Ras Beirut, in a prominent coastal strip of the Lebanese capital Beirut. The building belonged to a wealthy Lebanese-Armenian named Yacoub Yacoubian.

The edifice is an enormous 10-story, double-bloc building with 140 flats. Unlike the colonial style of Cairo's Yacoubian Building, Beirut's counterpart comes shaped like a U-turn, copying the style of Le Corbusier.
The building was famous for hosting a great number of artists, including singer Fayza Ahmed and comedian Abdel Salam Al Nabulsy. One floor underground was the venue of a famous Beirut night club called The Venus. During the Lebanese Civil War, the Venus closed its doors and the Yacoubian building declined.

The then-chic and now run-down famous Beirut edifice is a metaphor of Beirut's old architectural heritage and is subject of Spectrice (Yacoubian Building, Beirut) display and work of art commissioned in 2006-2008 and made of non-shrinking grout, aluminium, glass, fabric.

Beirut's Yacoubian Building is not to be confused with an equally important dominant edifice in Cairo, Egypt, called Yacoubian Building belonged to the Lebanese-Armenian businessman Hagop Yacoubian, from the same family.

References

Buildings and structures in Beirut
Armenian diaspora in Lebanon